Colorado's 22nd Senate district is one of 35 districts in the Colorado Senate. It has been represented by Democrat Jessie Danielson since 2023. Prior to redistricting the district was represented by Democrats Brittany Pettersen and Andy Kerr.

Geography
District 22 is based in the Denver suburb of Lakewood in Jefferson County, also stretching south to cover Dakota Ridge and Ken Caryl.

The district overlaps with Colorado's 1st, 2nd, and 7th congressional districts, and with the 22nd, 23rd, 24th, 25th, and 28th districts of the Colorado House of Representatives.

Recent election results
Colorado state senators are elected to staggered four-year terms; under normal circumstances, the 22nd district holds elections in midterm years. The 2022 election was the first held under the state's new district lines.

2022
Senator Brittany Pettersen ran and won Colorado's 7th congressional district in 2022, and Senator Jessie Danielson, who currently represents the neighboring 20th district, won the 22nd district election.

Historical election results

2018

2014

2012
Following 2012 redistricting, 22nd district incumbent Tim Neville was drawn out of his district and resigned to run instead for the 16th district in 2014, leaving the 22nd district open and triggering an off-cycle election.

Federal and statewide results in District 22

References 

22
Jefferson County, Colorado